Richard J. Joy (1924 – June 26, 1998) was the author of several books on Canadian language demographics. In 1967, he self-published the groundbreaking book, Languages in Conflict: The Canadian Experience, in which he used statistics from the 1961 census to demonstrate a number of points which ran counter to the accepted wisdom of the day:

Birthrates in Quebec were plunging, which meant that the French language could no longer keep pace with English purely through natural increase;
French was in serious decline outside of Quebec and a bilingual belt stretching eastwards into New Brunswick and west into eastern and north-eastern Ontario; 
English was in decline in all parts of Quebec other than Montreal.

Based on these considerations, Joy came to the following sombre conclusion:

In 1972, the book was re-published by Carleton University Press.

Joy updated his findings periodically, based on the results of the most recent decennial census. His second book, Canada's Official Language Minorities, was published by the C.D. Howe Institute in 1978.

His third book, Canada's Official Languages: The Progress of Bilingualism, was published by the University of Toronto Press in 1992. In this book, Joy concluded that “the data from the language questions of the 1986 census do not yield a straightforward answer to the administrator’s question: to what extent does the population of each municipality wish to be offered service in the minority language? …. What is required is a completely new question that will ask every Canadian his or her preferred official language.”

Joy was born in Montreal. He received a bachelor's degree from McGill University in 1945 and a master's degree from Harvard University in 1947.

See also
Demographics of Canada
Languages of Canada
Official bilingualism in Canada

References

Canadian non-fiction writers
Linguists from Canada
Writers from Quebec
McGill University alumni
1924 births
1998 deaths
Harvard University alumni
20th-century linguists
Canadian expatriates in the United States
Canadian demographers
Sociolinguists